Small snake orchid is a common name for several plants and may refer to:

 Diuris pedunculata, endemic to New South Wales
 Diuris chryseopsis, endemic to south-eastern Australia

See also
 Snake orchid